The Mountain Athletic Conference or (MAC) or sometimes just referred to as the Mountain Conference is a high school athletic conference with the Pennsylvania Interscholastic Athletic Association (PIAA) located in the state of Pennsylvania.  The conference is located primarily in the central region of the state.  Most of the conferences 9 member schools are located in District 6 of the PIAA, except for Clearfield Area Junior/Senior High School which is a member of District 9, but competes in District 6 athletic competitions.  The MAC consists of the Pennsylvania counties of Bedford, Blair, Centre, Clearfield and Huntingdon.

Member schools (football)

PIAA classifications

See also
 High school football
 PIAA Football Teams, Conferences and Leagues

References

Pennsylvania high school sports conferences
Pennsylvania Interscholastic Athletic Association